The heaviest land mammal is the African bush elephant, which has a weight of up to .

Heaviest extant land mammals

Notes

References

 

 
Heaviest
mammals
Heaviest or most massive organisms